FNJ may refer to:
 Federation of Nepalese Journalists
First Navy Jack
 National Front for Justice, a political party in Comoros
 National Front Youth, the youth wing of the French National Front
 Pyongyang International Airport, in North Korea